Prathigne (transl. Oath or Vow) is a 1964 Indian Kannada-language film, directed by B. S. Ranga and produced by B. S. Ranga. The film stars Rajkumar, K. S. Ashwath, Narasimharaju and Ganapathi Bhat. The film has musical score by S. Hanumantha Rao. This was the first movie in which Rajkumar played the role of a doctor on-screen.

Cast

Rajkumar as Dr.Shankar
K. S. Ashwath
Narasimharaju
Ganapathi Bhat
Rathnakar
Vijayarao
Girimaji
Master Babu
Baby Shyam
Pandari Bai
Jayanthi
Ramadevi
B. Jaya
Rama
Baby Vishalakshi

References

External links
 

1960s Kannada-language films
Films directed by B. S. Ranga